Pietermaritzburg Railway Station is the main railway station serving the city of Pietermaritzburg (/ˌpiːtərˈmærɪtsbɜːrɡ/), South Africa. It is located on Railway and Pine Streets in the South Western corner of the city centre. The station is a stop on long-distance passenger rail services operated by Shosholoza Meyl. Historically, the station is famous as being the place where Mahatma Gandhi was thrown off a train for riding first class in 1893.

References

Buildings and structures in Pietermaritzburg
Shosholoza Meyl stations
Transport in KwaZulu-Natal